Manathe Kottaram is a 1994 Indian Malayalam-language comedy-drama film directed by Sunil and written by Kalabhavan Ansar and Robin. The film was produced by Hameed under the banner of Gemi Movies and distributed by Star Plus Release. It stars Dileep, Nadirshah, Indrans, Harisree Ashokan and Khushbu. Suresh Gopi makes a cameo appearance. 

Meanwhile, ‘Manathe Kottaram’ was directed by Sunil.Dileep, Nadirsha, Harisree Ashokan, Indrans essayed the lead characters in the movie. The movie is about four young men, who are huge admirers of actress Khushboo. The four meeting the actress and a series of events taking place form the crux of the movie.

Plot 
Four struggling young men who were big fans of movie actress Khushboo finally get a chance to meet and befriend her when she moves into the mansion next door and through her Dileep also gets a chance to star in a movie.

Cast

Soundtrack 
The film's soundtrack contains 5 songs, all composed by Berny Ignatius, with lyrics by Gireesh Puthenchery.

References

External links
 

1994 films
1990s Malayalam-language films
Films scored by Berny–Ignatius
Films directed by Sunil